The year 1962 in film involved some very significant events, with Lawrence of Arabia winning seven Academy Awards including Best Picture and Best Director.

Top-grossing films (U.S.)

The top ten 1962 released films by box office gross in North America are as follows:

Events
 February – Warner Bros. buy the film rights for My Fair Lady for the unprecedented sum of $5.5 million plus 47¼% of the gross over $20 million.
 May – The Golden Horse Film Festival and Awards are officially founded by the Taiwanese government.
 June 18 – MCA Inc. finalize their merger with Decca-Universal.
 July 25 – Darryl F. Zanuck, one of the founders of 20th Century Fox, becomes president, replacing Spyros Skouras. Skouras becomes chairman of the board.
 August 5 – Hollywood legend Marilyn Monroe is found dead of a drug overdose.
 September 7 – Filming of Sergei Bondarchuk's War and Peace begins and will continue for another 5 years.
 October 5 – Dr. No launches the James Bond series, the second longest-running film franchise of all time (next to Godzilla), still running 60 years later (No Time to Die, 2021). It also launches the career of Sean Connery.

Awards 

Academy Awards:
 
Best Picture: Lawrence of Arabia – Horizon-Spiegel-Lean, Columbia
Best Director: David Lean – Lawrence of Arabia
Best Actor: Gregory Peck – To Kill a Mockingbird
Best Actress: Anne Bancroft – The Miracle Worker
Best Supporting Actor: Ed Begley – Sweet Bird of Youth
Best Supporting Actress: Patty Duke – The Miracle Worker
Best Foreign Language Film: Sundays and Cybele (Les dimanches de ville d'Avray), directed by Serge Bourguignon, France

Golden Globe Awards:

Drama:
Best Picture: Lawrence of Arabia
Best Actor: Gregory Peck – To Kill a Mockingbird
Best Actress: Geraldine Page – Sweet Bird of Youth
 
Comedy or Musical:
Best Picture − Comedy: That Touch of Mink
Best Picture − Musical: The Music Man
Best Actor: Marcello Mastroianni – Divorce Italian Style
Best Actress: Rosalind Russell – Gypsy

Other
Best Supporting Actor: Omar Sharif – Lawrence of Arabia
Best Supporting Actress: Angela Lansbury – The Manchurian Candidate
Best Director: David Lean – Lawrence of Arabia

Palme d'Or (Cannes Film Festival):
Keeper of Promises (O Pagador de Promessas), directed by Anselmo Duarte, Brazil

Golden Lion (Venice Film Festival):
Family Diary (Cronaca familiare, Journal intime), directed by Valerio Zurlini, France / Italy
My Name is Ivan (Ivanovo detstvo), directed by Andrei Tarkovsky, USSR

Golden Bear (Berlin Film Festival):
A Kind of Loving, directed by John Schlesinger, United Kingdom

1962 film releases
United States unless stated

January–March
January 1962
1 January
Heaven and Earth Magic
Sanjuro (Japan)
9 January
The Nun and the Sergeant
11 January
Only Two Can Play
12 January
Bachelor Flat
14 January
I Thank a Fool
17 January
The Intruder
18 January
My Geisha
19 January
Tender Is the Night
A View from the Bridge
26 January
The Three Stooges Meet Hercules
February 1962
7 February
Four Horsemen of the Apocalypse
Light in the Piazza
10 February
Sergeants 3
12 February
The Bellboy and the Playgirls
15 February
Pontius Pilate
21 February
The Couch
Walk on the Wild Side
28 February
Too Late Blues
March 1962
1 March
Posse from Hell
5 March
Rome Adventure
7 March
The Premature Burial
9 March
State Fair
10 March
Journey to the Seventh Planet
14 March
The Road to Hong Kong
21 March
Hitler
Sweet Bird of Youth
Gorath (Japan)
23 March
Satan in High Heels
Satan Never Sleeps
28 March
Hand of Death
The Manster (U.S./Japan)
Six Black Horses

April–June
April 1962
2 April
The Broken Land
5 April
Moon Pilot
6 April
Ivan's Childhood (U.S.S.R)
11 April
All Fall Down
Follow That Dream
House of Women
The Magic Sword
12 April
Cape Fear
13 April
Experiment in Terror
17 April
The Counterfeit Traitor
18 April
The Horizontal Lieutenant
19 April
Five Finger Exercise
22 April
Hands of a Stranger
The Man Who Shot Liberty Valance
23 April
Escape from Zahrain
25 April
Fire Monsters Against the Son of Hercules (Italy)
May 1962
3 May
The Brain That Wouldn't Die
Invasion of the Star Creatures
9 May
Jessica
War Hunt
17 May
Bon Voyage!
24 May
The Inspector
Lonely Are the Brave
25 May
The Cabinet of Caligari
When the Girls Take Over
June 1962
6 June
13 West Street
Big Red
Lad, A Dog
9 June
Eegah
13 June
It Happened in Athens
Lolita
Merrill's Marauders
15 June
Mr. Hobbs Takes a Vacation
19 June
Hatari!
The Music Man
That Touch of Mink
20 June
Confessions of an Opium Eater
The Pigeon That Took Rome
Ride the High Country
21 June
Boys' Night Out
26 June
Hell Is for Heroes
27 June
Safe at Home!
29 June
Beauty and the Beast

July–September
July 1962
3 July
Birdman of Alcatraz 
The Creation of the Humanoids 
Tarzan Goes to India 
4 July
Tales of Terror 
The Three Stooges in Orbit 
5 July
Panic in Year Zero! 
7 July
Advise & Consent 
15 July
Kujira Gami aka The Whale God (Japan)
16 July
Jack the Giant Killer
17 July
Air Patrol 
21 July
Black Gold 
25 July
Hemingway's Adventures of a Young Man 
26 July
The Lion 
The Notorious Landlady 
28 July
The Miracle Worker 
August 1962
1 August
Kid Galahad 
2 August
The Underwater City
3 August
The Spiral Road 
7 August
The Wonderful World of the Brothers Grimm 
8 August
The Interns 
11 August
King Kong vs. Godzilla (Japan)
17 August
Two Weeks in Another Town 
Guns of Darkness
22 August
Five Weeks in a Balloon 
29 August
The 300 Spartans
September 1962
15 September
Convicts 4 
16 September
Harakiri (Japan)
Billy Budd
25 September
The Longest Day 
26 September
Carnival of Souls
27 September
Gigot

October–December
October 1962
1 October
A Kind of Loving
3 October
Zotz!
4 October
Sodom and Gomorrah
5 October
The Chapman Report
Dr. No – (U.K.)
10 October
If a Man Answers
Long Day's Journey into Night
16 October
Requiem for a Heavyweight
18 October
Phaedra
22 October
Escape from East Berlin
24 October
The Manchurian Candidate
Tower of London
25 October
Tonight for Sure
The War Lover
31 October
Period of Adjustment
What Ever Happened to Baby Jane?
November 1962
1 November
How the West Was Won
Gypsy
2 November
The Reluctant Saint
8 November
Mutiny on the Bounty
14 November
In Search of the Castaways
21 November
It's Only Money
Two for the Seesaw
Girls! Girls! Girls!
27 November
The Main Attraction
December 1962
2 December
Pressure Point
6 December
Billy Rose's Jumbo
10 December
Lawrence of Arabia
12 December
Five Miles to Midnight
Freud: The Secret Passion
17 December
Gay Purr-ee
19 December
Taras Bulba
22 December
The Trial
25 December
To Kill a Mockingbird
Who's Got the Action?
26 December
David and Lisa
Days of Wine and Roses
31 December
40 Pounds of Trouble

Notable films released in 1962
United States unless stated

#
The 300 Spartans, starring Ralph Richardson, Richard Egan, Diane Baker
40 Pounds of Trouble, starring Tony Curtis, Suzanne Pleshette, and Larry Storch

A
Abhijan (The Expedition), directed by Satyajit Ray – (India)
Advise & Consent, directed by Otto Preminger, starring Henry Fonda, Charles Laughton, Walter Pidgeon, Don Murray, Peter Lawford
Alaverdoba, directed by Giorgi Shengelaia – (Georgia)
All Fall Down, directed by John Frankenheimer, starring Eva Marie Saint and Warren Beatty
All Night Long, starring Patrick McGoohan and Richard Attenborough – (U.K.)
All Souls' Day (Zaduszki) – (Poland)
The American Beauty (La belle américaine), directed by Robert Dhéry – (France)
The Amphibian Man (Chelovek-amfibiya) – (U.S.S.R.)
Appointment at the Tower, directed by Ezz El-Dine Zulficar, starring Salah Zulfikar and Soad Hosny – (Egypt)
Asli-Naqli (Real and Fake), starring Dev Anand – (India)
Atraco a las tres (Robbery at 3 O'Clock) – (Spain)
Attack of the Normans (I normanni), directed by Giuseppe Vari – (Italy)
An Autumn Afternoon (Sanma no aji), directed by Yasujirō Ozu – (Japan)
The Awful Dr. Orloff (Gritos en la noche), directed by Jesús Franco – (Spain)

B
Baat Ek Raat Ki (A Tale of One Night), starring Dev Anand – (India)
Bachelor Flat, starring Terry-Thomas, Tuesday Weld, Celeste Holm
Bees Saal Baad – (India)
The Bellboy and the Playgirls, directed by Francis Ford Coppola and Fritz Umgelter
Big and Little Wong Tin Bar, starring Jackie Chan and Sammo Hung – (Hong Kong)
Billy Budd, directed by and starring Peter Ustinov, with Robert Ryan and Terence Stamp – (U.K.)
Billy Rose's Jumbo, starring Doris Day and Jimmy Durante
Birdman of Alcatraz, directed by John Frankenheimer, starring Burt Lancaster, Karl Malden, Telly Savalas
Boccaccio '70, directed by Federico Fellini, Mario Monicelli, Vittorio De Sica and Luchino Visconti, starring Anita Ekberg and Sophia Loren – (Italy)
Bon Voyage!, starring Fred MacMurray and Jane Wyman
The Boys, directed by Sidney J. Furie, starring Richard Todd – (U.K.)
Boys' Night Out, starring Kim Novak and James Garner
The Brain That Wouldn't Die, starring Virginia Leith
The Brainiac (El baron del terror), directed by Chano Urueta – (Mexico)
The Bread of Those Early Years (Das Brot der frühen Jahre) – (West Germany)
The Broken Land, starring Kent Taylor, Diana Darrin and Jack Nicholson

C
Cape Fear, directed by J. Lee Thompson, starring Gregory Peck, Robert Mitchum, Polly Bergen, Telly Savalas
Captain Clegg (released as Night Creatures in the U.S.), directed by Peter Graham Scott – (U.K.)
Carnival of Souls, directed by Herk Harvey
Carry On Cruising, starring Sid James and Kenneth Williams – (U.K.)
Carry On Jack, starring Kenneth Williams, Bernard Cribbins and Juliet Mills – (U.K.)
Cartouche, starring Jean-Paul Belmondo and Claudia Cardinale – (France/Italy)
The Chapman Report, directed by George Cukor, starring Jane Fonda, Shelley Winters, Claire Bloom, Efrem Zimbalist, Jr.
Chased by the Dogs (El less wal kilab) – (Egypt)
Cléo from 5 to 7, directed by Agnès Varda – (France)
The Condemned of Altona (I sequestrati di Altona), directed by Vittorio De Sica, starring Sophia Loren and Maximilian Schell – (Italy)
Convicts 4, starring Ben Gazzara, Stuart Whitman, Vincent Price, Ray Walston, Sammy Davis, Jr.
The Counterfeit Traitor, directed by George Seaton, starring William Holden
Crazy Paradise (Det tossede paradis), directed by Gabriel Axel and starring Dirch Passer – (Denmark)
Crooks Anonymous, starring Leslie Phillips and Julie Christie

D
Damon and Pythias (Il tiranno di Siracusa), directed by Curtis Bernhardt – (U.S./Italy)
David and Lisa, starring Keir Dullea and Janet Margolin
The Day of the Triffids, starring Howard Keel – (U.K.)
Days of Wine and Roses, directed by Blake Edwards, starring Jack Lemmon, Lee Remick, Charles Bickford, Jack Klugman
Dead Man's Evidence, directed by Francis Searle – (U.K.)
The Devil's Agent (Im Namen des Teufels), directed by John Paddy Carstairs – (U.K./West Germany/Ireland)
Le Doulos (The Finger Man), directed by Jean-Pierre Melville, starring Jean-Paul Belmondo – (France)
Dr. No, first James Bond film, directed by Terence Young, starring Sean Connery, Joseph Wiseman, Jack Lord, Ursula Andress – (U.K.)
Dungeon of Harrow, directed by Pat Boyette

E
The Easy Life (Il sorpasso), directed by Dino Risi, starring Vittorio Gassman and Jean-Louis Trintignant – (Italy)
Eclipse (L'Eclisse), directed by Michelangelo Antonioni, starring Alain Delon and Monica Vitti – (Italy/France)
Eighteen in the Sun (Diciottenni al sole), directed by Camillo Mastrocinque  – (Italy)
Electra, directed by Michael Cacoyannis, starring Irene Papas – (Greece)
The Elusive Corporal (Le Caporal épinglé), directed by Jean Renoir, starring Jean-Pierre Cassel and Claude Brasseur – (France)
Escape from East Berlin, directed by Robert Siodmak, starring Don Murray
Escape from Zahrain, starring Yul Brynner, Sal Mineo and Jack Warden
Eva (released in the U.K. as Eve), starring Jeanne Moreau, Stanley Baker and Virna Lisi  – (Italy/France)
Experiment in Terror, directed by Blake Edwards, starring Glenn Ford, Lee Remick, Stefanie Powers, Ross Martin
The Exterminating Angel (El ángel exterminador), directed by Luis Buñuel – (Mexico)

F
The Fabulous Baron Munchausen (Baron Prášil), directed by Karel Zeman – (Czechoslovakia)
Family Diary (Cronaca familiare), starring Marcello Mastroianni – (Italy)
The Female: Seventy Times Seven (Setenta veces siete), starring Isabel Sarli – (Argentina)
Fire Monsters Against the Son of Hercules
Five Finger Exercise, starring Rosalind Russell
Five Miles to Midnight, starring Sophia Loren
Five Weeks in a Balloon
Follow That Dream, starring Elvis Presley, Arthur O'Connell, Joanna Moore
The Four Days of Naples (Le Quattro giornate di Napoli) – (Italy)
Four Horsemen of the Apocalypse, directed by Vincente Minnelli,  starring Glenn Ford, Ingrid Thulin, Yvette Mimieux
Freud: The Secret Passion, directed by John Huston, starring Montgomery Clift, Susannah York, Larry Parks
The Fury of Hercules (La furia di Ercole), written and directed by Gianfranco Parolini – (Italy)

G
Gay Purr-ee, an animated musical with the voices of Judy Garland and Mel Blanc
Geronimo, starring Chuck Connors
Gigot, starring Jackie Gleason
Girls! Girls! Girls!, starring Elvis Presley
Go to Blazes, directed by Michael Truman – (U.K.)
The Golden Arrow (L'arciere delle mille e una notte), directed by Antonio Margheriti – (Italy)
Gorath, directed by Ishirō Honda – (Japan)
The Grim Reaper (La commare secca), directed by Bernardo Bertolucci – (Italy)
Gundamma Katha, starring N. T. Rama Rao – (India)
Guns of Darkness, directed by Anthony Asquith, starring David Niven and James Robertson Justice – (U.K.)
Gypsy, directed by Mervyn LeRoy, starring Rosalind Russell, Karl Malden, Natalie Wood

H
H.M.S. Defiant, starring Alec Guinness and Dirk Bogarde – (U.K.)
Half Ticket, starring Kishore Kumar and Madhubala – (India)
Hand of Death, starring John Agar
Hands of a Stranger, directed by Newt Arnold
Harakiri (Seppuku), directed by Masaki Kobayashi – (Japan)
Hatari!, directed by Howard Hawks, starring John Wayne, Red Buttons, Hardy Krüger, Elsa Martinelli
Hell Is for Heroes, starring Steve McQueen and Bobby Darin
Hemingway's Adventures of a Young Man, directed by Martin Ritt, starring Richard Beymer, Diane Baker, Corinne Calvet, Paul Newman
Hero's Island, starring James Mason and Rip Torn
Hombre de la esquina rosada (Man on Pink Corner) – (Argentina)
The Horizontal Lieutenant, starring Jim Hutton and Paula Prentiss
The Horrible Dr. Hichcock (L'orribile segreto del Dr. Hichcock), directed by Riccardo Freda – (Italy)
House of Women, starring Shirley Knight and Constance Ford
How the West Was Won, starring James Stewart, Henry Fonda, Eli Wallach, John Wayne, Debbie Reynolds, Gregory Peck, Carroll Baker, George Peppard and more
Hussar Ballad (Gusarskaya ballada) – (U.S.S.R.)
Hussar of the Dead (El Húsar de la Muerte), (Restored, originally released in 1925) – (Chile)

I
If a Man Answers, starring Bobby Darin and Sandra Dee
In Search of the Castaways, starring Hayley Mills and Maurice Chevalier
In the Affirmative (L'Amour avec des si), directed by Claude Lelouch – (France)
In the French Style, starring Jean Seberg
The Inn on the River (Das Gasthaus an der Themse), directed by Alfred Vohrer – (West Germany)
The Inspector, aka Lisa, directed by Mark Robson, starring Dolores Hart
The Invisible Dr. Mabuse (Die Unsichtbaren Krallen des Dr. Mabuse), starring Wolfgang Preiss – (West Germany)
The Intruder, directed by Roger Corman, starring William Shatner
The Iron Maiden, starring Anne Helm and Jeff Donnell
It Happened in Athens, starring Jayne Mansfield – (Greece/United States)
It's Only Money, directed by Frank Tashlin. starring Jerry Lewis and Joan O'Brien
Ivan's Childhood (Ivanovo detstvo), directed by Andrei Tarkovsky – (U.S.S.R.)

J
Jack the Giant Killer, starring Kerwin Mathews
Jessica, starring Angie Dickinson
La Jetée, directed by Chris Marker – (France)
Jigsaw, starring Jack Warner – (U.K.)
Journey to the Seventh Planet, directed by Sid Pink – (Denmark)
Jules and Jim, directed by François Truffaut, starring Jeanne Moreau and Oskar Werner – (France)

K
Kanchanjangha, directed by Satyajit Ray – (India)
Kid Galahad, starring Elvis Presley, Gig Young, Lola Albright, Charles Bronson
A Kind of Loving, directed by John Schlesinger, starring Alan Bates – (U.K.)
King Kong vs. Godzilla, directed by Ishirō Honda – (Japan)
Knife in the Water (Nóż w wodzie), directed by Roman Polanski – (Poland)

L
The L-Shaped Room, directed by Bryan Forbes, starring Leslie Caron and Tom Bell – (U.K.)
Lawrence of Arabia, directed by David Lean, starring Peter O'Toole, Omar Sharif, Anthony Quinn, Alec Guinness, José Ferrer – (UK/US)
The Legend of Lobo, a Walt Disney production
Life for Ruth, starring Patrick McGoohan and Michael Craig – (U.K.)
Light in the Piazza, starring Olivia de Havilland, Yvette Mimieux, George Hamilton
The Lion, starring William Holden and Trevor Howard
Lisa (aka The Inspector), starring Stephen Boyd – (U.S./U.K.)  
Lolita, directed by Stanley Kubrick, starring James Mason, Shelley Winters, Peter Sellers, Sue Lyon
The Loneliness of the Long Distance Runner, directed by Tony Richardson, starring Tom Courtenay – (U.K.)
Lonely Are the Brave, starring Kirk Douglas, Walter Matthau, Gena Rowlands, George Kennedy, Carroll O'Connor
Lonely Boy, a documentary about Paul Anka – (Canada)
Long Day's Journey into Night, directed by Sidney Lumet, starring Katharine Hepburn
The Longest Day, starring John Wayne, Henry Fonda, Richard Burton, Sean Connery, Robert Mitchum, Rod Steiger and more
Love, Thy Name Be Sorrow (Koiya koi nasuna koi), directed by Tomu Uchida – (Japan)
Love at Twenty, a film in 5 segments directed by François Truffaut, Shintaro Ishihara, Andrzej Wajda, Renzo Rossellini and Marcel Ophüls – (International)
Love on a Pillow, starring Brigitte Bardot – (France)
Lulu, directed by Rolf Thiele, starring Nadja Tiller – (Austria)

M
Madison Avenue, starring Dana Andrews, Jeanne Crain, Eleanor Parker
Mafioso, starring Alberto Sordi – (Italy)
The Magic Sword, directed by Bert I. Gordon
The Magnificent Concubine (Yang Kwei Fei) – (Hong Kong)
The Main Attraction, starring Pat Boone
Mamma Roma, directed by Pier Paolo Pasolini, starring Anna Magnani – (Italy)
The Man of Gold (Az aranyember) – (Hungary)
The Man Who Shot Liberty Valance, directed by John Ford, starring John Wayne, James Stewart, Lee Marvin, Vera Miles, Edmond O'Brien, Woody Strode
The Manchurian Candidate, directed by John Frankenheimer, starring Frank Sinatra, Laurence Harvey, Janet Leigh, Leslie Parrish, Angela Lansbury
March on Rome (La marcia su Roma), starring Ugo Tognazzi and Vittorio Gassman – (Italy)
Merrill's Marauders, directed by Samuel Fuller, starring Jeff Chandler and Ty Hardin
Mediterranean Holiday (Traumreise unter weissen Segeln), a documentary directed by Hermann Leitner and Rudolf Nussgruber – (West Germany)
The Memorial Gate for Virtuous Women (열녀문 – Yeolnyeomun), directed by Shin Sang-ok – (South Korea)
The Miracle Worker, directed by Arthur Penn, starring Anne Bancroft and Patty Duke
Mister Magoo's Christmas Carol, (on NBC-TV)
Mix Me a Person, directed by Leslie Norman, starring Anne Baxter, Donald Sinden and Adam Faith – (U.K.)
Mondo Cane, directed by Paolo Cavara, Franco Prosperi and Gualtiero Jacopetti – (Italy)
A Monkey in Winter (Un singe en hiver), directed by Henri Verneuil – (France)
Mr. Hobbs Takes a Vacation, starring James Stewart and Maureen O'Hara
Moon Pilot, starring Tom Tryon
The Music Man, starring Robert Preston, Shirley Jones, Buddy Hackett, Paul Ford, Ron Howard
Mutiny on the Bounty, starring Marlon Brando and Trevor Howard
My Geisha, starring Shirley MacLaine
My Life to Live (Vivre sa vie), directed by Jean-Luc Godard, starring Anna Karina – (France)

N
Night of the Eagle (retitled Burn, Witch, Burn! in the U.S.), starring Janet Blair
Nine Days in One Year (9 dney odnogo goda) – (U.S.S.R.)
The Notorious Landlady, starring Kim Novak, Jack Lemmon and Fred Astaire

O
On the Beat, starring Norman Wisdom – (U.K.)
Only Two Can Play, starring Peter Sellers
Operation Snatch, directed by Robert Day and starring Terry-Thomas and George Sanders – (U.K.)
O Pagador de Promessas (The Keeper of Promises), directed by Anselmo Duarte – (Brazil)

P
Panic in Year Zero!, starring Ray Milland and Frankie Avalon
Period of Adjustment, starring Jane Fonda, Jim Hutton, Anthony Franciosa, Lois Nettleton
Phaedra, directed by Jules Dassin, starring Melina Mercouri and Anthony Perkins – (Greece)
The Phantom of the Opera, starring Herbert Lom – (U.K.)
The Pigeon That Took Rome, starring Charlton Heston
The Pirates of Blood River, directed by John Gilling – (U.K.)
Pitfall (Otoshiana) – (Japan)
Play It Cool, starring Billy Fury – (U.K.)
Pontius Pilate, starring Jean Marais, Jeanne Crain, Basil Rathbone
Premature Burial, directed by Roger Corman, starring Ray Milland, Hazel Court, Heather Angel
Pressure Point, starring Sidney Poitier and Bobby Darin
Pretty Foe by Esmail Koushan (Iran)
Professor, starring Shammi Kapoor – (India)
The Puzzle of the Red Orchid (Das Rätsel der Roten Orchidee), directed by Helmut Ashley – (West Germany)

R
Redhead (Die Rote or La rossa) – (West Germany/Italy)
Requiem for a Heavyweight, starring Anthony Quinn, Jackie Gleason, Mickey Rooney, Julie Harris
Revenge of the Snakes (Yılanların öcü) – (Turkey)
Ride the High Country (a.k.a. Guns in the Afternoon), directed by Sam Peckinpah, starring Joel McCrea and Randolph Scott
The Road to Hong Kong, directed by Norman Panama, starring Bing Crosby, Bob Hope and Joan Collins
Roaring Years (Anni ruggenti), starring Nino Manfredi – (Italy)
Rome Adventure, starring Angie Dickinson and Suzanne Pleshette
Der rote Rausch (The Red Intoxication), starring Klaus Kinski – (Austria)

S
Safe at Home!, starring Mickey Mantle and Roger Maris
Sahib Bibi Aur Ghulam (King, Queen and Slave), starring Meena Kumari and Guru Dutt – (India)
Salvatore Giuliano, directed by Francesco Rosi – (Italy)
Samar, directed by and starring George Montgomery
Sanjuro (Tsubaki Sanjûrô), directed by Akira Kurosawa, starring Toshiro Mifune – (Japan)
Satan in High Heels, starring Meg Myles and Grayson Hall
Sergeants 3, starring Frank Sinatra, Dean Martin, Sammy Davis, Jr., Peter Lawford, Joey Bishop
Seven Seas to Calais (Il dominatore dei sette mari), directed by Rudolph Maté – (Italy)
Shaheed, starring Musarrat Nazir, Talish, Allauddin, Ejaz, Saqi (Pakistani film on the Palestinian-Israeli Conflict)
She'll Have to Go (released in the United States as Maid for Murder), directed by Robert Asher – (U.K.)
She Knows Y'Know, directed by Montgomery Tully – (U.K.)
Sherlock Holmes and the Deadly Necklace/ Sherlock Holmes und das Halsband des Todes (German) a Sherlock Holmes mystery directed by Terence Fisher, written by Curt Siodmak, starring Christopher Lee as Holmes and Thorley Walters as Watson
Slaughter of the Vampires (La strage dei vampiri), directed by Roberto Mauri – (Italy)
Solo for Sparrow, directed by Gordon Flemyng – (U.K.)
Some People, starring Kenneth More – (U.K.)
Something's Got to Give, starring Marilyn Monroe and Dean Martin (unfinished)
The Spiral Road, starring Rock Hudson and Gena Rowlands
State Fair, starring Pat Boone, Tom Ewell, Ann-Margret, Pamela Tiffin, Bobby Darin
The Suitor (Le Soupirant) – (France)
Sundays and Cybele (Les dimanches de ville d'Avray), starring Hardy Krüger and Nicole Courcel – (France)
Sweet Bird of Youth, starring Paul Newman, Geraldine Page, Shirley Knight, Ed Begley, Rip Torn
Swordsman of Siena (La congiura dei dieci/Le mercenaire), starring Stewart Granger – (Italy/France)
A Symposium on Popular Songs, a Disney animation

T
The Tale of Zatoichi (Zatōichi monogatari), directed by Kenji Misumi – (Japan)
The Tale of Zatoichi Continues (Zoku Zatōichi Monogatari), starring Shintaro Katsu – (Japan)
Tales of Terror, starring Vincent Price, Peter Lorre and Basil Rathbone
Taras Bulba, starring Yul Brynner and Tony Curtis
Tarzan Goes to India, Jock Mahoney's first film as Tarzan
Tender Is the Night, starring Jennifer Jones
Term of Trial, starring Laurence Olivier and Simone Signoret – (U.K.)
The Testament of Dr. Mabuse (Das Testament des Dr. Mabuse), starring Wolfgang Preiss – (West Germany)
That Touch of Mink, starring Cary Grant and Doris Day
Thérèse Desqueyroux, starring Emmanuelle Riva and Philippe Noiret – (France)
The Three Stooges In Orbit, starring the Three Stooges
Time to Remember, directed by Charles Jarrott – (U.K.)
To Kill a Mockingbird, directed by Robert Mulligan, starring Gregory Peck
Tobacco (Tyutyun) – (Bulgaria)
Tonny, directed by Nils R. Müller and Per Gjersøe – (Norway)
Too Late Blues, directed by John Cassavetes, starring Bobby Darin and Stella Stevens
Tower of London, starring Vincent Price
Treasure of the Silver Lake, directed by Harald Reinl – (West Germany)
The Cursed Palace, starring Salah Zulfikar and Mariam Fakhr Eddine – (Egypt)
The Trial (Le Procès), directed by and starring Orson Welles with Anthony Perkins and Jeanne Moreau – (France/Italy/West Germany)
The Trial of Joan of Arc (Procès de Jeanne d'Arc), directed by Robert Bresson – (France)
Tudor – (Romania)
The Twelve Chairs (Las doce sillas), directed by Tomás Gutiérrez Alea – (Cuba)
Two for the Seesaw, starring Shirley MacLaine and Robert Mitchum
Two Half Times in Hell (Két félidő a pokolban), directed by Zoltán Fábri – (Hungary)
Two Weeks in Another Town, directed by Vincente Minnelli, starring Kirk Douglas, Edward G. Robinson, George Hamilton, Cyd Charisse

U 
 The Unscrupulous Ones (Os Cafajestes), directed by Ruy Guerra – (Brazil)

V
A Very Private Affair, starring Brigitte Bardot – (France)
A View from the Bridge (Vu du Pont), directed by Sidney Lumet, starring Raf Vallone – (France/Italy)
Violent Life (Una vita violenta), directed by Paolo Heusch and Brunello Rondi – (Italy)
Vive le Tour, documentary by Louis Malle – (France)

W
Walk on the Wild Side, starring Laurence Harvey, Capucine, Jane Fonda
Waltz of the Toreadors (a.k.a. The Amorous General), directed by John Guillermin, starring Peter Sellers – (U.K.)
War of the Buttons (La Guerre des boutons) – (France)
We Joined the Navy, starring Kenneth More – (U.K.)
What Ever Happened to Baby Jane?, directed by Robert Aldrich, starring Bette Davis and Joan Crawford
Who's Got the Action? starring Dean Martin and Lana Turner
The Witch's Curse (Maciste all'inferno), directed by Riccardo Freda – (Italy)
The Wonderful World of the Brothers Grimm, starring Laurence Harvey and Claire Bloom

Z
Zorro the Avenger
Zotz!, directed by William Castle, starring Tom Poston

Short film series
Looney Tunes (1930–1969)
Terrytoons (1930–1964)
Merrie Melodies (1931–1969)
Bugs Bunny (1940–1964)
Yosemite Sam (1945–1963)
Speedy Gonzales (1953–1968)
The Alvin Show (1961-1962)

Births
January 4 – Michael France, American screenwriter (d. 2013)
January 5 – Suzy Amis Cameron, American actress
January 7 – Kiiri Tamm, Estonian actress
January 9 - Conrad Goode, American actor, screenwriter, screenwriter, producer and musician
January 10 – C. Martin Croker, American animator and voice actor (d. 2016)
January 17 – Jim Carrey, Canadian actor and comedian
January 20 - Sophie Thompson, British actress
January 21 - Marie Trintignant, French actress (d. 2003)
January 23 - Richard Roxburgh, Australian actor, writer, producer and director
February 2 - Michael T. Weiss, American actor
February 4 - Michael Riley, Canadian actor
February 5 – Jennifer Jason Leigh, American actress
February 7 - Eddie Izzard, English stand-up comedian, actor, writer and political activist
February 13 – Michele Greene, American actress
February 16 - Alexa Kenin, American actress (d. 1985)
February 17 – Lou Diamond Phillips, American actor
February 22
Steve Irwin, Australian zookeeper, television personality, conservationist, actor (d. 2006)
Ethan Wayne, American actor
February 27 – Adam Baldwin, American actor
March 2 - Jon Bon Jovi, American singer, songwriter, guitarist, and actor
March 8 – Cecilia Yip, Hong Kong actress
March 10 – Jasmine Guy, American actress, singer, dancer and director
March 11 - Jeffrey Nordling, American actor
March 12 – Chris Sanders, American actor, animator, director and voice actor
March 18
Thomas Ian Griffith, American actor
Etsushi Toyokawa, Japanese actor
March 20 – Stephen Sommers, American director, screenwriter and producer
March 21 
Matthew Broderick, American actor
Kathy Greenwood, Canadian actress and comedian
Rosie O'Donnell, American actress and comedian
March 23 - Jenny Wright, American actress
March 25 - Thom Bierdz, American actor
April 2 – Clark Gregg, American actor, director and screenwriter
April 5 - Lana Clarkson, American actress and model (d. 2003)
April 15 – Tom Kane, American actor and voice actor
April 24 - Jason Salkey, English actor
April 27 – James LeGros, American actor
May 5 - Manoj Sood, Indo-Canadian actor
May 9 - Sean McNamara (filmmaker), American director, producer, actor and screenwriter
May 12 – Emilio Estevez, American actor
May 14 - Danny Huston, American actor, director and writer
May 17 - Craig Ferguson, Scottish-American television host, comedian, author and actor
May 18
Nathaniel Parker, English actor
Karel Roden, Czech actor
May 26 – Bobcat Goldthwait, American actor, comedian and director
May 29 - John D. LeMay, American former actor
May 31 - Sebastian Koch, German actor
June 5
Jeff Garlin, American comedian and actor
Ken Hudson Campbell, American actor
June 6 - Todd Kimsey, American actor (d. 2016)
June 7 - Lance Reddick, American actor and musician (d. 2023)
June 10
Gina Gershon, American actress
Tzi Ma, Hong Kong-American actor
June 13 – Ally Sheedy, American actress
June 19 – Paula Abdul, American singer
June 22 - Nicholas Lea, Canadian actor
June 27
Emel Heinreich, Turkish-Austrian actress, author and film-director
Tony Leung Chiu-wai, Hong Kong actor
June 30 - Predrag Bjelac, Serbian actor
July 2 - Doug Benson, American comedian, television host and actor
July 3 – Tom Cruise, American actor
July 4 - Neil Morrissey, English actor, voice actor, comedian, singer and businessman
July 8 - Oreste Baldini, Italian actor and voice actor
July 13
Michael Jace, American former character actor
Tom Kenny, American actor, voice actor, singer and comedian
July 19 – Anthony Edwards, American actor
July 20 – Carlos Alazraqui, voice actor
July 23 - Eriq La Salle, American actor, director, writer and producer
July 29 - Kevin Spirtas, American actor
July 31 – Wesley Snipes, American actor
August 1 - Jesse Borrego, American actor
August 6 – Michelle Yeoh, Malaysian actress
August 12 - Miss Cleo, American television personality (d. 2016)
August 13 – John Slattery, American actor
August 14 - Steve Reevis, Native American actor (d. 2017)
August 16 – Steve Carell, American actor, comedian, voice artist, producer, writer, director
August 20
Geoffrey Blake (actor), American actor
Ravil Isyanov, Russian actor (d. 2021)
August 24 – David Koechner, American actor and comedian
August 25 - Rusty Schwimmer, American character actress and singer
August 27 – Vic Mignogna, American voice actor
August 29
Ian James Corlett, Canadian-American voice actor
Lycia Naff, American actress
August 31 – Dee Bradley Baker, American voice actor
September 1 - Michelle Meyrink, Canadian former actress
September 8 – Thomas Kretschmann, German actor
September 11 – Kristy McNichol, American actress
September 15 – Scott McNeil, Australian-Canadian voice actor
September 17
Paul Feig, American actor, director, comedian and filmmaker
Baz Luhrmann, Australian director
September 19 - Cheri Oteri, American actress and comedian
September 21 - Mark Holden, Canadian actor, writer and producer
September 22 - Rob Morrow, American actor and director
September 24 – Nia Vardalos, Canadian-American actress and producer
September 26 – Melissa Sue Anderson, American actress
October 1 – Esai Morales,  American actor
October 2 – Jeff Bennett, American actor and voice actor
October 5 - Ricky Harris, American producer, actor and comedian (d. 2016)
October 6 - Joaquín Cosío, Mexican actor
October 11 – Joan Cusack, American actress
October 12 – Deborah Foreman, American actress
October 13 – Kelly Preston, American actress (d. 2020)
October 14 - Trevor Goddard, English actor (d. 2003)
October 15 - Simon Kunz, English actor
October 20 - David Mickey Evans, American director and screenwriter
October 22 - Bob Odenkirk, American actor, comedian, writer, director and producer
October 26 – Cary Elwes, English actor
October 27 - Brontis Jodorowsky, Mexican-French actor
October 28
Jason Watkins, English actor
Daphne Zuniga, American actress
November 1 - Brenda Chapman, American writer, storyboard artist and director
November 7 - Tracie Savage, American actress and journalist
November 11
Gerard Horan, English actor
Demi Moore, American actress
November 14 – Harland Williams, Canadian-American actor and comedian
November 19 – Jodie Foster, American actress and director
November 28 – Jon Stewart, American actor and comedian
November 29 – Andrew McCarthy, American actor
December 9 – Felicity Huffman, American actress
December 10 - Scott Capurro, American comedian, writer and actor
December 19 – Jill Talley, American actress
December 22 – Ralph Fiennes, English actor
December 23 - Peter Ramsey, American storyboard artist, story artist, director, writer and producer

Deaths
January 13 – Ernie Kovacs, 42, American comedian, actor, North to Alaska, Bell, Book and Candle
January 28 – Hermann Wlach, 77, Austrian actor, The Pearl Maker of Madrid
February 1 – Carey Wilson, American screenwriter, Mutiny on the Bounty
February 19 – James Barton, American actor, Here Comes the Groom, Yellow Sky
February 20 – Halliwell Hobbes, 84, British actor, Gaslight, That Hamilton Woman
February 27 – Willie Best, 48, American actor, Nothing but the Truth, The Red Dragon
February 28 – Chic Johnson, 70, American comedian, actor, Hellzapoppin'
March 17 – Frank Orth, 82, American actor, Nancy Drew... Detective, Here Come the Girls
April 10 – Michael Curtiz, 75, Hungarian-born director, Casablanca, The Adventures of Robin Hood
April 15 – Clara Blandick, 85, American actress, The Wizard of Oz, Tom Sawyer
April 17 – Louise Fazenda, 66, American actress, Tillie's Punctured Romance, Alice in Wonderland
April 22 
Angus MacPhail, 59, British screenwriter, Spellbound, The Wrong Man
Vera Reynolds, 62, American actress, The Night Club, Feet of Clay
May 14 – Florence Auer, 82, American actress, The Bishop's Wife, State of the Union
June 2 – Aeneas MacKenzie, 72, Scottish screenwriter, The Ten Commandments, Ivanhoe
June 6 – Guinn "Big Boy" Williams, 63, American actor, Nevada, Southwest Passage
June 19
Frank Borzage, 69, American director, actor, A Farewell to Arms, 7th Heaven
Will Wright, 68, American actor, Quantrill's Raiders, Alias Jesse James
June 24 – Lucile Watson, 83, Canadian actress, Waterloo Bridge, Made for Each Other
July 2 – Valeska Suratt, 80, American stage and screen actress, The Immigrant
July 4 – Rex Bell, 58, American actor, Broadway to Cheyenne, Law and Lead
July 13 – Jerry Wald, 50, American screenwriter and producer, Mildred Pierce, Peyton Place
July 23 – Victor Moore, 86, American actor, It Happened on Fifth Avenue, Louisiana Purchase
July 30 – Myron McCormick, 54, American actor, The Hustler, No Time for Sergeants
August 5 – Marilyn Monroe, 36, American actress, Hollywood icon, Gentlemen Prefer Blondes, Some Like It Hot
August 23 – Hoot Gibson, 70, American actor, Action, The Horse Soldiers
September 7 – Louis King, 64, American director, Typhoon, Green Grass of Wyoming
October 2 – Frank Lovejoy, 50, American actor, The Hitch-Hiker, Goodbye, My Fancy
October 6 – Tod Browning, 82, American director, Dracula, Freaks
October 26 – Louise Beavers, 60, American actress, Holiday Inn, The Jackie Robinson Story
November 15 – Irene, American costume designer, Shall We Dance, Midnight Lace
December 15 – Charles Laughton, 63, British actor, Spartacus, Witness for the Prosecution
December 17 – Thomas Mitchell, 70, American actor, It's a Wonderful Life, Gone with the Wind
December 21 – Syd Saylor, 67, American actor, The Lost Jungle, The Three Mesquiteers
December 23 – Luis Alberni, 76, Spanish actor, Svengali, The Count of Monte Cristo
December 28 – Kathleen Clifford, 75, American actress, When the Clouds Roll By, Richard the Lion-Hearted
December 29 – Hugh Sinclair, 59, British actor, The Saint's Vacation, Judgment Deferred

Film debuts 
Bernardo Bertolucci (director) – The Grim Reaper
Jackie Chan – Big and Little Wong Tin Bar
Julie Christie – Crooks Anonymous
Tom Courtenay – Private Potter
Robert Duvall – To Kill a Mockingbird
Samantha Eggar – Dr. Crippen
Sally Field – Moon Pilot
John Hurt – The Wild and the Willing
Ian McShane – The Wild and the Willing
Sarah Miles – Term of Trial
Richard Mulligan – 40 Pounds of Trouble
Bob Newhart – Hell Is for Heroes
Sydney Pollack (actor) – War Hunt
Jack Riley – Days of Wine and Roses
George A. Romero (director) – Expostulations
Tom Skerritt – War Hunt
Terence Stamp – Term of Trial
David Warner – We Joined the Navy
William Windom – To Kill a Mockingbird

References 

 
Film by year